Hedley Brett Wilson (born 23 August 1957) is a former New Zealand rugby union player. Primarily a hooker but also a useful flanker, Wilson represented Counties and Hawke's Bay at a provincial level, and was a member of the New Zealand national side, the All Blacks, on their 1983 tour of Scotland and England. He played three matches for the All Blacks but did not appear in any internationals.

References

1957 births
Living people
Rugby union players from Auckland
People educated at King's College, Auckland
New Zealand rugby union players
New Zealand international rugby union players
Counties Manukau rugby union players
Hawke's Bay rugby union players
Rugby union hookers
Rugby union flankers
Lincoln University (New Zealand) alumni